is a Japanese football player.

Club statistics
Updated to 18 November 2018.

References

External links
Profile at Nara Club

Profile at Nagano Parceiro

1989 births
Living people
Association football people from Chiba Prefecture
Japanese footballers
J2 League players
J3 League players
Japan Football League players
Shonan Bellmare players
Zweigen Kanazawa players
SC Sagamihara players
AC Nagano Parceiro players
Nara Club players
Veertien Mie players
Association football midfielders